Easy Wheels is a 1989 American comedy film directed by David O'Malley and written by Ivan Raimi, Sam Raimi (credited as Celia Abrams, the name of his mother), and O'Malley.

Plot
The story is a satire of the outlaw biker film genre. It follows two biker gangs, one male and one female.

The male biker gang are the "Born Losers". They are good guys with three missions in life: Find the evil, Destroy the evil, and find a really great lite beer. Their leader, played by Paul LeMat, has visions because of a steel plate in his head. He is being studied by one of his fellow bikers from MIT.

The female biker gang are the "Women of the Wolf". Their leader, played by Eileen Davidson, was abandoned by her parents and raised by wolves. She plans to create a new generation of fearless independent women by kidnapping baby girls and taking them to the woods to be raised by wolves. Male babies are sold on the black market.

In the inevitable clash, the leader of the "Woman of the Wolf" must choose between the attraction she feels for the leader of the Born Losers, and the culmination of her allegedly feminist ideals.

Mark Holton also appeared in the film.

References

1989 action comedy films
1989 films
American action comedy films
Films shot in California
Films with screenplays by Ivan Raimi
Films with screenplays by Sam Raimi
Outlaw biker films
1980s English-language films
Films directed by David O'Malley
1980s American films